The 2009 Nordic Trophy Junior was the third and last Nordic Trophy Junior ice hockey tournament, played between 20 August- and 23 August, 2009. This time, the tournament was held in Linköping, Sweden.

Regulation round

Division CCM

Standings

Games

20 August 
 Färjestads BK – HV71 5 – 1 (2–0, 2–0, 1–1)
 Linköpings HC – Tappara 4 – 5 (0–1, 2–1, 2–3)

21 August 
 Färjestads BK – Tappara 8 – 1 (2–1, 3–0, 3–0)
 Linköpings HC – HV71 1 – 2 (0–0, 1–2, 0–0)

22 August 
 Linköpings HC – Färjestads BK 5 – 7 (2–1, 1–3, 2–3)
 Tappara – HV71 2 – 4 (0–0, 2–2, 0–2)

Division Reebok

Standings

Games

20 August 
 Kärpät – Djurgårdens IF 4 – 3 GWS (1–1, 2–1, 0–1, 0–0, 1–0)
 Malmö Redhawks – Frölunda HC 0 – 4 (0–1, 0–3, 0–0)

21 August 
 Frölunda HC – Djurgårdens IF 7 – 4 (2–2, 3–2, 2–0)
 Malmö Redhawks – Kärpät 8 – 4 (1–1, 3–1, 4–2)

22 August 
 Kärpät – Frölunda HC 0 – 6 (0–1, 0–5, 0–0)
 Malmö Redhawks – Djurgårdens IF 2 – 7 (0–1, 1–5, 1–1)

Playoffs

Games

23 August 
 Place 7–8: Kärpät – Linköpings HC 2 – 4 (0–2, 0–0, 2–2)
 Place 5–6: Malmö Redhawks – Tappara 5 – 2 (1–2, 3–0, 1–0)
 Bronze medal game: HV71 – Djurgårdens IF 4 – 3 (0–1, 1–2, 3–0)
 Final: Färjestads BK – Frölunda HC 2 – 1 (1–0, 1–0, 0–1)

Final standings

References 
 http://www.nordictrophy.com/junior.php

See also 
 2009 Nordic Trophy (disambiguation)

Nordic Trophy Junior
2009
Nor
Nordic